Bosqueville High School or Bosqueville Secondary School is a public high school located in a Bosqueville on the north edge of Waco, Texas that serves about 300 students in grades 6-12.  It is part of the Bosqueville Independent School District and classified as a 2A school by the UIL.  The district covers unincorporated Bosqueville and parts of Waco.  Even though the district is mostly in Bosqueville area, it is actually addressed to Waco.  In 2015, the school was rated "Met Standard" by the Texas Education Agency.

Athletics
The Bosqueville Bulldogs compete in the following sports: Cross Country, Volleyball, Football, Basketball, Golf, Tennis, Track, Softball and Baseball.

State Titles
Baseball - 
2008(1A)
Softball - 
2007(1A)

References

External links
Bosqueville ISD

Schools in McLennan County, Texas
Public high schools in Texas